was a feudal domain under the Tokugawa shogunate of Edo period Japan, located in the Nasu region of northern Shimotsuke Province (modern-day Tochigi Prefecture), Japan. It was centered on Karasuyama Castle in what is now part of the city of Karasuyama, Tochigi. Karasuyama was ruled by a number of clans in its early history, but was ruled by a junior branch of the Ōkubo clan from the mid-Edo period onwards. The Karasuyama Ōkubo clan maintained a secondary jin'ya in what is now Atsugi, Kanagawa to administer its extensive holdings in Sagami Province.

History
The Nasu clan ruled the Nasu district of northern Shimotsuke Province from the Kamakura period. During the late Sengoku period, partly for failing to participate in the 1590 Battle of Odawara, Toyotomi Hideyoshi divided their holdings, creating Nasu Domain (20,000 koku) for the Nasu clan, and awarding their ancestral castle, Karasuyama Castle and 20,000 koku to Narita Ujinaga. The Narita were vassals of the Odawara Hōjō, who pledged allegiance to the Toyotomi after the fall of their liege. Ujinaga’s son Narita Ujitada fought on the side of Tokugawa Ieyasu against the Uesugi clan and in the Battle of Sekigahara and was awarded an increase to 37,000 koku. His son, Narita Ujimune died without heir in 1622 and the clan was reduced to hatamoto status.

Karasuyama was briefly ruled by the Matsushita clan from 1623–1627, before their transfer to Nihonmatsu Domain. From 1627–1672, the Hori clan ruled Karasuyama, during which time they made extensive renovations to the castle and surrounding castle town. They were followed briefly by a branch of the Itakura clan (1672–1681) and then the Nasu clan (1682-1687). However, the Nasu were dispossessed by Shōgun Tokugawa Tsunayoshi following a succession dispute, and were replaced by Nagai Naohiro (1687–1701), who later was transferred to Ako Domain after its confiscation from Asano Naganori following the Forty-seven rōnin incident. A junior branch of the Itakura clan then ruled Karasuyama from 1701–1725.
 
Karasuyama was then awarded to Ōkubo Tsuneharu, a former wakadoshiyori who already had a 15,000 koku holding in Omi province. He later became a rōjū, and his descendants continued to rule Karasuyama until the end of the Tokugawa shogunate. The 3rd Ōkubo daimyō, Ōkubo Tadaaki faced severe financial difficulties compounded by peasant uprisings. His successors, Ōkubo Tadayoshi and Ōkubo Tadashige opened new rice lands and reformed the domain’s finances. The 6th Ōkubo daimyō, Ōkubo Tadayasu had able administrators, and followed the teachings of Ninomiya Sontoku.

The Boshin war of the Meiji restoration largely bypassed the area. After the abolition of the han system in July 1871, Karasuyama Domain became part of Tochigi Prefecture. 

The domain had a population of 26,257 people in 5957 households for all of its holdings, per a census in 1869.

Holdings at the end of the Edo period
As with most domains in the han system, Karasuyama Domain consisted of several discontinuous territories calculated to provide the assigned kokudaka, based on periodic cadastral surveys and projected agricultural yields. Due to its history, its majority of its territory was divided between Shimotsuke and Sagami Provinces.

Shimotsuke Province
13 villages in Haga District
35 villages in Nasu District
6villages in Moka District
Shimōsa Province
2 villages in Toyoda District
1 village in Soma District
Sagami Province
2 villages in Kamakura District
13 villages in Koza District
7 villages in Osumi District
10 villages in Aiko District

List of daimyōs

References

External links
  Karasuyama on "Edo 300 HTML"

Notes

Domains of Japan
1591 establishments in Japan
States and territories established in 1591
1871 disestablishments in Japan
States and territories disestablished in 1871
Shimotsuke Province
History of Tochigi Prefecture